Knud Bruun Jensen (born 2 July 1929) is a Danish rower. He competed in the men's coxless four event at the 1952 Summer Olympics.

References

1929 births
Living people
Danish male rowers
Olympic rowers of Denmark
Rowers at the 1952 Summer Olympics
Sportspeople from Aarhus